Phiditia cuprea is a moth in the family Phiditiidae. It was described by William James Kaye in 1901. It is found in Trinidad.

The wingspan is 52–60 mm. The forewings are shining coppery-brown with an elongated cream-coloured mark close to the wing margin.

References

Bombycoidea
Moths described in 1901